The Buliminida is an  order of mostly benthic foraminifera with tests commonly of perforate, hyaline, radially laminated calcite, with chambers arranged biserially or triserially, at least in the early stages. Superfamilies include the Bolivinacea,  Buliminacea, Eouvigerinacea, and  Turrilinacea.

References

 A. R. Loeblich and H. Tappan, 1964. Sarcodina Chiefly "Thecamoebians" and Foraminiferida; Treatise on Invertebrate Paleontology, Part C Protista 2. Geological Society of America and University of Kansas Press.
Byrun  K. Sen Gupta, 1999:  Modern Foraminifera, Chapter 2 Systematics of Modern Foraminifera. Kluwer Academic Publishers  

Foraminifera orders
Globothalamea